Egelsee is a lake in the municipality of Bubikon in the Canton of Zurich, Switzerland.

Geography 
During the Würm glaciation around 12,000 years ago, the Rhine/Linth Glacier shaped the landscape in the Zurich Oberland. A tributary crept up from Lake Zurich into the upper Glatt valley. When it melted back, it left behind many troughs with numerous small lakes, so-called dead lakes. Many of these lakes silted up, only a few remained, one of which is the Egelsee. Its surface originally measured 650,000 m² and today its size has shrunk to just 35,000 m².

In 1991, the lake and the surrounding bog were included in the list of raised and transitional bogs of national importance and in 1994 it was included in the list of fens of national importance.

External links

 
Nature path around the lake 

Lakes of Switzerland
Lakes of the canton of Zürich
Bubikon
LEgelsee